Jens Piesbergen (born 16 October 1964) is a Swiss curler and curling coach.

Teams

Men's

Mixed

Record as a coach of national teams

References

External links
 
 
 
 
 

Living people
1964 births
Swiss male curlers
Swiss curling champions
Swiss curling coaches